Spiritual Battle is the first album by the Norwegian band Drottnar, released in 2000 on the British label Plankton Records. Spiritual Battle is a compilation album of the band's first two demos, both of which were recorded at X-Ray Studios.

Music and lyrics
The songs "Away from the Destruction", "Doom of Antichrist", "Missing Souls" and "Frykt Ikke" are taken from the demo Doom of Antichrist, which was recorded in May 1997 when the group was known as Vitality. Musically, these songs focus on death/doom, and the vocals are deep, guttural death growls.

The songs "A White Realm", "Natten på Harmageddon" and "Spiritual Battle" were recorded in September 1998 when the group changed its name to Drottnar. Originally made for promotional purposes only, the CD was entitled A White Realm. Musically it emphasizes on folk-influenced black metal. The songs are minimalistic and focus on groovy rhythms.

The lyrics on the album deal with warfare in the spiritual realm. Spiritual Battle received positive reviews among critics; for example, Cross Rhythms gave it 8/10. The album also brought the band a following in the underground metal scene. During its release, the Info-Black.com - The Ultimate Black Metal Informative Site webzine claimed that Drottnar belonged to the elite of Scandinavian underground.

Track listing
"A White Realm" (6:30)
"Natten på Harmageddon" (4:40) .mp3
"Spiritual Battle" (4:44) .mp3
"Away from the Destruction" (7:12)
"Doom of Antichrist" (5:39)
"Missing Souls" (4:08)
"Frykt Ikke" (6:21)
"Untitled" (0:47)

Track 8 is hidden.

Personnel
Sven-Erik Lind – vocals
Karl Fredrik Lind – guitar
Bjarne Peder Lind – bass
Glenn-David Lind – drums

References

External links
 Spiritual Battle at Guitar6.com
 Spiritual Battle at Encyclopaedia Metallum
 Spiritual Battle at The Whipping Post

Drottnar albums
2000 albums
Death-doom albums
Viking metal albums